Bombardieri is an Italian surname. Notable people with the surname include:

Daniel Bombardieri (born 1985), Italian footballer
Tony Bombardieri (born 1978), Italian figure skater

Italian-language surnames